The following is a list of the MTV Europe Music Award winners and nominees for Best Turkish Act. Both Emre Aydın and maNga have subsequently gone on to win the award for Best European Act.

2000s

2010s

MTV Europe Music Awards
Turkish music awards
Awards established in 2007